The following tables show state-by-state results in the Australian Senate at the 1901 federal election. Senators total 17 Free Trade, 11 Protectionist, and eight Labour. The terms were deemed to start on 1 January 1901. In each state, the first three elected received full six-year terms, and the three senators elected with the lowest number of votes retire after three years.

Australia

When parliament sat, the two independent protectionists sat as formal Protectionists, while David O'Keefe, a Protectionist from Tasmania, joined the Labour caucus. This left 17 Free Trade, 11 Protectionist and 8 Labour senators.

New South Wales

Each elector voted for up to six candidates; as such percentages are shown of the total number of voters rather than the total number of votes.

Victoria

Each elector voted for up to six candidates; as such percentages are shown of the total number of voters rather than the total number of votes.

Although Fraser and Zeal were not selected Protectionist candidates, they sat as formal Protectionists in parliament.

Queensland

Each elector voted for up to six candidates; as such percentages are shown of the total number of voters rather than the total number of votes.

There was no protectionist or free trade organisation in Queensland in 1901; the Labour Party was the only formal political party. Candidates' designations are assigned according to whether they publicly identified with the protectionist or free trade cause. Elected candidates sat with their respective parties.

Western Australia

Each elector voted for up to six candidates; as such percentages are shown of the total number of voters rather than the total number of votes.

South Australia

Each elector voted for up to six candidates; as such percentages are shown of the total number of voters rather than the total number of votes.

Tasmania

Each elector cast a single vote, Tasmania being the only state to use this method.

There was no labour organisation in Tasmania, although O'Keefe joined the Labour caucus when parliament sat.

See also 
 Candidates of the 1901 Australian federal election
 Results of the 1901 Australian federal election (House of Representatives)
 Members of the Australian Senate, 1901–1903

References

1901 elections in Australia
Senate 1901
Australian Senate elections